Thurnham Hall is a grade-I-listed 17th-century country house in the village of Thurnham, Lancashire, England some 10 km (6 miles) south of Lancaster.

The present building is a three-storey stone-built house probably built in the 17th century for Robert Dalton. It stands facing west in 30 acres of rising ground about a half a kilometre (quarter of a mile) from the left bank of the River Conder. The building contains an impressive Jacobean Great Hall and now functions as a resort hotel.

History
In the 12th century the property belonged to the de Thurnham family and then, by descent, to the Flemming, Cancerfield, Harrington, Bonvile and Grey families. Henry Grey, 1st Duke of Suffolk, and father of Lady Jane Grey, sold the estate to London grocer Thomas Lonne, who resold it three years later to Robert Dalton of Bispham, Lancashire. Robert probably built the present house soon after the purchase. His only son Thomas was mortally wounded at the second Battle of Newbury and the estate passed, after having been confiscated and later returned, to Thomas' young son Robert. Robert left only a daughter, Elizabeth, who married William de Hoghton of Park Hall, Charnock Richard. Their son John took the surname Dalton and was involved in the Jacobite rising of 1715.  For this he was imprisoned in London and his land was confiscated, but after his release he walked back to Lancaster and recovered Thurnham after paying a large fine.

John Dalton married Mary Gage and carried out some modernisation of the building in 1823, replacing the front facade and adding corner turrets and embattled parapet. His son John died childless and the property passed to John Jnr's sister Elizabeth in 1837, who built a private chapel in the hall in 1854. On her death in 1861 she was succeeded by a distant cousin, Sir James Fitzgerald, who adopted the additional surname of Dalton. He died childless in 1867 without issue and his brother, Sir Gerald Dalton-Fitzgerald, succeeded to the property. Most of the contents of Thurnham were sold and the remainder transferred to the Dalton-Fitzgerald's Essex estate.

Thurnham then returned to the main Dalton line in the form of William Henry Dalton and descended in turn via his sons John Henry and William Augustus. After the latter's death the hall stood empty and became derelict. It was purchased in the early 1970s by Stanley Crabtree  who completely renovated the building. Part of the hall had been damaged by fire in 1959.

See also

Grade I listed buildings in Lancashire
Listed buildings in Thurnham, Lancashire

References

Country houses in Lancashire
Grade I listed buildings in Lancashire
Buildings and structures in the City of Lancaster
Grade I listed houses